The 2019 Butler Bulldogs men's soccer team represented Butler University during the 2019 NCAA Division I men's soccer season and the 2019 Big East Conference men's soccer season. The regular season began on August 30 and concluded on November 6. It was the program's 31st season fielding a men's varsity soccer team, and their 7th season in the Big East Conference. The 2019 season was Paul Snape's ninth year as head coach for the program.

Roster

Schedule 

Source:

|-
!colspan=6 style=""| Non-conference regular season
|-

|-
!colspan=6 style=""| Big East regular season
|-

|-
!colspan=6 style=""| Big East Tournament
|-

|-
!colspan=6 style=""| NCAA Tournament
|-

References 

2019
Butler Bulldogs
Butler Bulldogs
Butler Bulldogs men's soccer
Butler Bulldogs